Masada: Het, also known as ח or Masada 8, is a 1997 album by American composer and saxophonist John Zorn released on the Japanese DIW label.   It is the eighth album of Masada recordings.

Reception
The Allmusic review by Don Snowden awarded the album 4 stars stating "Het isn't spectacular Masada full of fireworks, but there's plenty of that around -- this is just a very good, solid disc packed with strong performances and material".

Track listing 
All compositions by John Zorn.
 "Shechem" - 11:25
 "Elilah" - 4:38
 "Kodashim" - 4:40
 "Halom" - 2:00
 "Ne'eman" - 9:56
 "Abed-Nego" - 7:14
 "Tohorot" - 4:39
 "Mochin" - 6:37
 "Amarim" - 4:28
 "Khebar" - 4:40

Personnel 
 John Zorn — alto saxophone
 Dave Douglas — trumpet
 Greg Cohen — bass
 Joey Baron — drums

References

1997 albums
Masada (band) albums
Albums produced by John Zorn
DIW Records albums